Parallel is an upcoming American science fiction thriller film written by Aldis Hodge and his brother Edwin Hodge with Jonathan Keasey, and directed by Kourosh Ahari. The film stars Danielle Deadwyler as a grief-stricken woman who mysteriously finds herself navigating between parallel spaces. It is a remake of Lei Zheng's award-winning Chinese feature Parallel Forest.

Cast and characters
 Danielle Deadwyler as Vanessa
 Aldis Hodge
 Edwin Hodge

Production
On May 12, 2021, it was reported that Aldis Hodge and his brother Edwin Hodge will remake of the award winning Lei Zheng-directed Chinese film Parallel Forest. Kourosh Ahari will direct. On June 21, 2022, Danielle Deadwyler has signed on to star and exec producer on film. Filming began in Vancouver later in June.

References

External links

Upcoming films
Upcoming English-language films
American science fiction thriller films